The English rock band Radiohead have released nine studio albums, one live album, five compilation albums, one remix album, nine video albums, seven EPs, 33 singles and 48 music videos. Their debut album, Pablo Honey, released in February 1993, reached number 22 in the UK, receiving platinum certifications in the UK and US. Their debut single, "Creep", remains their most successful, entering the top ten in several countries. Their second album, The Bends, released in March 1995, reached number four in the UK and is certified triple platinum.

Radiohead's third album, OK Computer, was released in May 1997. It remains their most successful album, reaching one in the UK and Ireland and the top ten in several other countries. It was certified triple platinum and produced the UK top-ten singles "Paranoid Android", "Karma Police" and "No Surprises". Kid A followed in October 2000, topping the charts in the UK and becoming first number-one Radiohead album on the US Billboard 200. Amnesiac was released in May 2001, topping the UK charts and producing the singles "Pyramid Song" and "Knives Out". Hail to the Thief was released in June 2003, ending Radiohead's contract with EMI. It was Radiohead's fourth consecutive UK number-one album and was certified platinum.

Radiohead released their seventh album, In Rainbows, in October 2007 as a download for which customers could set their own price; a conventional retail release followed. It sold more than three million copies in one year. "Nude" and "Jigsaw Falling Into Place" were released as singles; "Nude" was Radiohead's first top-40 hit on the US Billboard Hot 100 since "Creep". Radiohead released their eighth album, The King of Limbs, in February 2011. It ended their streak of number-one albums in the UK, reaching number seven, and is the only Radiohead album not to be certified gold in the US. In April 2016, following the purchase of EMI by Universal Music, Radiohead's back catalogue transferred to XL Recordings, who had released the retail editions of In Rainbows and The King of Limbs. Radiohead released their ninth album, A Moon Shaped Pool, in May 2016, backed by the singles "Burn the Witch" and "Daydreaming".

In June 2017, Radiohead released a 20th-anniversary OK Computer reissue, OK Computer OKNOTOK 1997 2017, including unreleased tracks, two of which were released as download singles: "I Promise" and "Man of War". In June 2019, several hours of recordings from the OK Computer period leaked online; in response, Radiohead made them available to purchase online as MiniDiscs [Hacked], with all proceeds to the environmentalist group Extinction Rebellion. Kid A Mnesia, an anniversary reissue compiling Kid A, Amnesiac and previously unreleased material, was released in November 2021, promoted with the singles "If You Say the Word" and "Follow Me Around".

Albums

Studio albums

Live albums

Compilation albums

Remix albums

Demo albums
"On a Friday" (1986) (as On a Friday) (recorded in Abingdon School music room)
Medicinal Sounds (1987) (as On a Friday) (recorded in Sphincter Studios in Marcham)
"Gripe" (1988) (as On a Friday) (recorded in Woodworm Studios)
"The Greatest Shindig" (1990) (as Shindig) (recorded in Clifton Hampden Village Hall, Nuneham Courtenay Village Hall, and on home 4-track)
Untitled (nicknamed "Dungeon Demo") (1991) (as On a Friday) (recorded in Dungeon Studios)
First Tapes (aka Manic Hedgehog) (1991) (as On a Friday) (recorded in Courtyard Studios)

Video albums

EPs

Singles

Promotional singles

Other charted and certified songs

Music videos

Notes

References

See also
 List of songs recorded by Radiohead

External links
 Official website
 Radiohead at AllMusic
 
 

Alternative rock discographies
Discographies of British artists
Discography
Rock music group discographies